Moonlight Hours is the first single taken from Australian indie band The Holidays' debut album. It was released digitally in late 2009. Recorded at home and self-produced, with additional recording and production at BJB Studios with the help of Burke Reid, Moonlight Hours was the most played track on national youth radio station Triple J for the week ending 26 December 2009. The track was mixed in Melbourne by Tony Espie and mastered by David Walker at Stepford Audio Melbourne.

A music video was also made for Moonlight Hours by Moop Jaw in January 2010.

Track listing 
"Moonlight Hours"

References

External links 
 Official Website
 Liberation Music

2010 singles
2009 songs
Song articles with missing songwriters